Carcharodus tripolinus, the false mallow skipper, is a species of butterfly in the  family Hesperiidae. It is found along a narrow strip along the coast of southern Portugal and Spain and across North Africa.

It is externally indistinguishable from Carcharodus alceae, but the male genitalia show significant differences which is why they are treated as different species.

The wingspan is 26–34 mm. Adults are on wing from March to September.

The larvae feed on Malva sylvestris. They have also been recorded on Althaea in Egypt.

External links
Butterfly Guide
European Butterflies
Lepiforum.de

Carcharodus
Butterflies described in 1925
Taxa named by Ruggero Verity